There are two All Seasons Arenas

All Seasons Arena (Mankato)
All Seasons Arena (Minot)